Ruben III, also Roupen III, Rupen III, or Reuben III, (1145 – Monastery of Drazark, May 6, 1187) was the ninth lord of Armenian Cilicia or “Lord of the Mountains” (1175–1187).

Roupen remained always friendly to the Crusaders in spirit. He was a just and good prince, and created many pious foundations within his domains.

His life
He was the eldest son of Stephen, the third son of Leo I, lord of Armenian Cilicia. His mother was Rita, a daughter of Sempad, Lord of Barbaron. Roupen's father, who was on his way to attend a banquet given by the Byzantine governor of Cilicia, Andronicus Euphorbenus, was murdered on February 7, 1165. Following his father's death, Roupen lived with his maternal uncle, Pagouran, lord of the fortress of Barbaron, protecting the Cilician Gates pass in the Taurus Mountains.

Roupen took up the reins of Cilicia following the assassination of his paternal uncle, Mleh who had been murdered by members of his own inner circle of Armenian nobles on May 15, 1175. He was a friend of the Franks (the Crusaders); for example, at the end of 1177, he assisted Philip, Count of Flanders and Prince Bohemond III of Antioch at the ineffectual siege of Harenc.

In June 1180, Saladin, the sultan of Egypt, and Kilij Arslan II, the sultan of Iconium met on the river Sanja and there, apparently concluded an alliance. The first fruits of their alliance were a short and successful campaign against Roupen III, on the pretext of harsh treatment of the Turkoman tribes in his territories. Roupen made peace with Kilij Arslan II in the same year. In the course of the year, many of the nobles of the Principality of Antioch who hated Sybilla, the new wife of Bohemond III fled to Roupen's court.

Early in 1181, Roupen came on a pilgrimage to Jerusalem, and there on 4 February1181/3 February 1182 he married Isabella of Toron, daughter of Humphrey III of Toron and Stephanie of Milly.

At the end of 1182, the Byzantine governor of Cilicia, Isaac Comnenus, in revolt against the Emperor Andronicus I Comnenus, sought help from Bohemond III against Roupen and admitted his troops into Tarsus. Bohemond promptly changed his mind and sold Tarsus and the governor to Roupen, then repented of it. Isaac Comnenus was ransomed by the Knights Templar.

In 1183, Hethum III of Lampron, allied with Bohemond III, began joint hostilities against Roupen. They invited Roupen to Antioch as a prelude to ending the counterproductive rivalry between the two Armenian houses, but upon his arrival Roupen was taken captive and imprisoned. But Roupen's brother Leo finished off the conquest of the Hethoumians and attacked Antioch.

Roupen's release required payment of a large ransom and the submission of Adana and Mamistra as vassalages to Antioch; but on his return to Cilicia he soon recovered them. Bohemond III made various ineffectual raids but achieved nothing more.

Roupen abdicated in favor of his brother and retired to the monastery of Drazark where he died.

Marriage and children
# (4 February 1181 – 3 February 1182) Isabella of Toron, a daughter of Humphrey III of Toron and Stephanie of Milly
Alice (1182 – after 1234), the wife firstly of Hethum of Sassoun, secondly of Count Raymond IV of Tripoli, and thirdly of Vahram of Korikos
Philippa (1183 – before 1219), the wife firstly of Shahanshah of Sassoun, and secondly of Theodore I Laskaris, emperor of Nicaea

Footnotes

Sources 

Ghazarian, Jacob G: The Armenian Kingdom in Cilicia during the Crusades: The Integration of Cilician Armenians with the Latins (1080–1393); RoutledgeCurzon (Taylor & Francis Group), 2000, Abingdon;

External links
Greeks, Crusaders and Moslems — Rise of Leon II (Kurkjian's History of Armenia, Ch. 28)
Smbat Sparapet's Chronicle

1187 deaths
1145 births
12th-century Armenian people
Monarchs of the Rubenid dynasty